Clue to Kalo is a Folktronica band from Adelaide, South Australia, featuring Mark Mitchell and a revolving cast of supporting musicians.  Clue To Kalo’s initial commercial success came in the US through LA-based Mush Records.

They were featured in Spin as Artist of the Day in September 2005.

Lily Perdida, released 20 January 2009, has received critical favor.

History
Adelaide's Clue to Kalo began as Mark Mitchell's solo recording project, piecing together samples and electronic instruments into "multilayered... homemade puzzle pop".

As the band developed into a full line-up, Mark continued to record the base tracks on his computer, allowing the other members to layer their contributions on top.

Their 2005 release, One Way, It's Every Way, earned them a spot in that year's South by Southwest festival.  

Clue to Kalo completed recording Lily Perdida in 2007, with Ellen Carey as a full-time member.

Mark has suspended his pursuit of a PhD in English Cultural Studies at a South Australian University to support the band full-time.

Discography

Albums
2003: Come Here When You Sleepwalk
2005: One Way, It's Every Way
2009: Lily Perdida

EPs
2006: Man Who Took a Step Expecting a Stair But Instead Got Level Ground - Tour CD/Limited Edition 12" Picture Disc

Videography

Videos
2005: "The Just is Enough"

References

External links

Clue to Kalo official website
Clue to Kalo on MySpace
 Video for "The Just is Enough" on YouTube
Interview: 4/9/09

Australian indie rock groups